is a Japanese talent agency headquartered in Aoyama, Minato, Tokyo. It was founded in 1970 and manages talents in a variety of fields including modelling and acting. The company has a large roster of talents, making it one of the largest talent agencies in Japan alongside Johnny's and Yoshimoto. There are over 6000 people working or affiliated as staff and talent with Oscar Promotion. The company is also involved in television production with numerous drama shows.

They are known for hosting the Japan Bishōjo Contest since 1987, a beauty contest which introduced many famous actresses and models.

Talents under the agency are forbidden to be in a relationship until they are 25 years old.

Notable talents

Female tarento 

Noriko Aota
Hina Aoyama
Kimiko Ikegami
Eri Imai
Aya Ueto
Miyuki Ono
Kazusa Okuyama
Ichika Osaki
Marie Kai
Reon Kadena
Mayuko Kawakita
Aki Kawamura
Rei Kikukawa
Azusa Kishimoto
Natsumi Kiyoura
Sakura Komoriya
Tamiyo Kusakari
Mitsuko Kusabue
Koharu Kusumi
Ayano Kudo
Ayame Goriki
Keiko Kojima
Fuka Koshiba
Kumiko Goto
Aiko Sato
Jun Shibuki
Hikaru Takahashi
Emi Takei
Michiko Tanaka
Fumie Nakajima
Asumi Nakada
Shizuka Nakamura
Jun Hasegawa
Anna Hachimine
Mikie Hara
Natsuki Harada
Yuko Fueki
Saki Fukuda
Miki Fujitani
Nicole Fujita
Naomi Hosokawa
Miyu Honda
Marin Honda
Moeko Matsushita
Miki Maya
Aki Mizusawa
Erena Mizusawa
Izumi Mori
Misato Ugaki
Miki Yanagi
Megumi Yokoyama
Miyu Yoshimoto
Youn-a
Noa Tsurushima
Yurina Kawaguchi

Male tarento 

 Hiroki Iijima
 So Okuno
 Noboru Kaneko
 Taro Shigaki
 Ryō Tamura
 Konosuke Takeshita
 Kaito Nakamura
 Shun Nishime
 Akihisa Shiono
 Yasuyuki Maekawa
 Hiroaki Murakami
 Kohji Moritsugu

Former Oscar Promotion artists 
Aguri Ōnishi
Akane Hotta
Asuka Kishi
Shioli Kutsuna

References

External links 

 Oscar Promotion website

 
Talent agencies based in Tokyo
Mass media companies established in 1970
Mass media companies based in Tokyo
Entertainment companies of Japan
1970 establishments in Japan
Japanese talent agencies